Peter E. Madden (born March 16, 1942 in Boston) is an American businessman and politician who served as President of State Street Bank and represented the 14th Norfolk District in the Massachusetts House of Representatives for one term (1993 to 1995).

References

1942 births
Republican Party members of the Massachusetts House of Representatives
People from Weston, Massachusetts
Babson College alumni
Harvard University alumni
Living people